Robert Hamada is the former Edward Eagle Brown Distinguished Service Professor of Finance and former Dean of the University of Chicago Booth School of Business.

Early life
A third-generation Japanese American, Hamada was born in San Francisco, California in 1937.  He and his family were sent to the Amache internment camp during World War II due to Executive Order 9066.  Following their release, the Hamada family moved to New York.

Hamada received his B.A. in Chemical Engineering from Yale University and his S.M. Industrial Management, and Ph.D. Finance, in 1961 and 1969 respectively from the MIT Sloan School of Management.

See also
 Hamada's equation

References

External links
 Chicago GSB Bio

1937 births
Living people
People from San Francisco
Japanese-American internees
MIT Sloan School of Management alumni
University of Chicago faculty
Yale University alumni
American academics of Japanese descent
Place of birth missing (living people)
Educators from California
American chemical engineers
Engineers from California
Corporate finance theorists